Darren Cole (born 3 January 1992) is a Scottish footballer who plays as a defender for NIFL Premiership outfit Dungannon Swifts on loan from Glentoran. He has previously played for Rangers, Partick Thistle, Greenock Morton, Livingston and Broxburn Athletic.

Club career

Rangers
Cole signed a two-year contract extension with Rangers on 2 December 2010 and made his first-team debut five days later against Turkish side Bursaspor in Rangers' final 2010–11 UEFA Champions League group match, which ended 1–1. Cole's performance was praised by manager Walter Smith.

Cole did not feature in the Rangers first team under Ally McCoist during the 2011–12 season. He was loaned to Partick Thistle in early January.

Cole suffered ankle ligament damage in January 2013, which was expected to rule him out for the remainder of the 2012–13 season. He did make an appearance in the final game of the season, against Berwick Rangers. Cole had his contract with Rangers terminated on 28 August 2013, after he failed to report for a reserve team friendly game with junior club Cambuslang Rangers.

Greenock Morton
On 27 December 2013, Cole signed for Greenock Morton until the end of the season. He left Morton in the summer of 2014 after just six months at the club.

Livingston
On 20 February 2015, Cole signed for Scottish Championship club Livingston until the end of the 2014–15 season. After impressing in his first season at Livingston, he not only won a new contract, but also was named captain for the season 2015–16. Following the club's relegation to League One, Cole was released from his contract on 15 July 2016.

Broxburn Athletic
In August 2016, Cole signed a one-year contract with Junior Super League club Broxburn Athletic. He was a regular in the team, appearing 28 times for the Albyn Park club, scoring one goal.

Cole's missed out on playing in the 2017 Fife and Lothians Cup Final against Tranent Juniors, as his side lost 1–0, at New Victoria Park, Newtongrange.

Derry City
In June 2017 Cole signed a six-month contract with League of Ireland Premier Division club Derry City. On the 16 September, Cole scored in the 2018 League of Ireland Cup Final in a 3–1 win over League of Ireland First Division side Cobh Ramblers. He signed a new contract with the club in February 2019.

Glentoran
Cole signed for Glentoran in December 2021. The defender signed for Dungannon Swifts on loan in August 2022.

International career
Cole has represented Scotland at various age levels.

Career statistics

Honours
Rangers
Scottish League Two: 2012–13

Derry City
League of Ireland Cup: 2018

References

External links

1992 births
Living people
Footballers from Edinburgh
Scottish footballers
Scotland youth international footballers
Scotland under-21 international footballers
Association football defenders
Rangers F.C. players
Partick Thistle F.C. players
Scottish Football League players
League of Ireland players
Greenock Morton F.C. players
Livingston F.C. players
Scottish Professional Football League players
Broxburn Athletic F.C. players
Derry City F.C. players
Glentoran F.C. players
Dungannon Swifts F.C. players